Kofi Bagabena (born 25 November 1988) is a Ghanaian cricketer. He was named in Ghana's squad for the 2017 ICC World Cricket League Division Five tournament in South Africa. He played in Ghana's second fixture, against Vanuatu, on 4 September 2017.

In May 2019, he was named in Ghana's squad for the Regional Finals of the 2018–19 ICC T20 World Cup Africa Qualifier tournament in Uganda. He made his Twenty20 International (T20I) debut for Ghana against Namibia on 20 May 2019.

On 16 October 2021, Bagabena became the first Ghanaian cricketer to take a hat-trick in a T20I match, and the second to take a five-wicket haul in T20I cricket, doing so in the match against the Seychelles.

References

External links
 

1988 births
Living people
Ghanaian cricketers
Ghana Twenty20 International cricketers
Place of birth missing (living people)
Twenty20 International hat-trick takers